The Vindel River (Swedish: Vindelälven) is a river in northern Sweden. It is a tributary to Ume River and the biggest tributary river in Sweden. It lends its name to the Vindelfjällens Nature Reserve, one of the largest protected areas in Europe, totaling 562,772 ha (approx. 5,628 km2). Since it is partially located with the reserve, it is permanently protected from hydroelectric development. Downstream from where Vindelälven merges with Umeälven Sweden's largest hydropower plant is located. Considering that the river is not unregulated all the way to the ocean, but just in the part of it formally called Vindelälven, the decision to call it "unregulated" or "permanently protected from hydropower" is to be taken with a grain of salt. The river Vindel and its tributaries were important routes for transporting timber in northern Sweden, up until 1976. To ease the movement of logs downstream, wooden dams were constructed (to be opened when timber was transported), side streams were cut off and tributaries were straightened and cleared. These changes significantly affected the river ecosystem and populations of wild fish, mammals, mussels and other species of aquatic and riparian habitats. The changes therefore negatively impact the favourable conservation status of species and habitats within the Vindel River Natura 2000 network site. Actions to restore the tributaries of the Vindel River to a more natural state are considered a priority by the Swedish environmental protection agency, the Västerbotten county administrative board, and the EU under the Habitats Directive and the Water Framework Directive (WFD).The general objective of the Vindel River LIFE project was to achieve a ‘good status’ for the waters of the Vindel River with reference to the Water Framework Directive, and ‘good conservation status’ for the species in the project area under the Habitats Directive. The aim was to reduce the negative impacts of fragmentation and channelisation caused by timber-floating infrastructure in tributaries of the Vindel River system. The work was focused on a number of river stretches, altogether spanning just over 44 km, with the aim of removing 73% of the obstructions to natural river flow, placing large boulders and fallen trees in the water to simulate natural conditions and to reconnect streams to the tributaries to open up breeding areas for migrating fish. The Vindel River LIFE project restored streams in the tributaries of the Vindel River basin, by removing timber-floating infrastructure, replacing large obstacles into the water, and creating and restoring fish spawning grounds. These ecosystem restoration measures resulted in improved water quality, and improvements in conditions for protected species, in line with national and EU policy. The project’s work had clear socio-economic benefits in the project area.

The project restored streams in 26 tributaries of the Vindel River catchment, all in the Natura 2000 network. Tributaries were restored by using either demonstration methods (10 sites), where innovative techniques were demonstrated, or existing best-practice methods. The project team removed 20 wooden ‘splash’ dams, widened channels, opened side channels, placed large objects (boulders and in-stream wood) in streams to diversify flow and retain organic material, and restored/constructed 1 068 spawning grounds for fish (using imported gravel). They succeeded in removing at least 73% of the former timber-floating infrastructure in the project areas (certain constructions with high cultural and historical value were left for educational purposes). New areas were made available as possible migration routes, enabling species to reach previously closed spawning and nursing areas; in total, the project generated more than 4 000 ha of new areas accessible for fish reproduction. Follow-up studies showed that the demonstration restorations made the streams wider, more structurally complex, and with decreased current velocity having more variability. Good ecological status was reported in all 10 demonstration sites, and most of the best-practice restoration sites have good or moderate ecological status. In policy terms, the project helped achieve good water status, with reference to the Water Framework Directive. The project improved conditions in two habitat types listed in the Habitats Directive and improving the conservation status for several species listed in Annex II of the directive: otter (Lutra lutra), pearl mussel (Margaritifiera margaritifera), a good indicator of water quality, Atlantic salmon (Salmo salar) and bullhead (Cottus gobio), along with the economically-important brown trout (Salmo trutta).

In the Vindel River area as a whole, more salmon are migrating up the river today than at any other time since the national monitoring programme started, and salmon and brown trout are using the restored spawning sites. As a result of restoring river flow dynamics, and increasing connectivity between streams in the Vindel River catchment, 288 km of river stretches have been gained, and the riparian zone along the river is also recovering; although full recovery of riparian habitats may take many years.

The project beneficiaries organised a range of dissemination, awareness-raising and networking activities, actively involving local stakeholders and the general public. The restoration work and the subsequent improvement in the conservation status of the Vindel River offers a unique opportunity to boost both ecotourism and sport fishing, thus favouring socio-economic development. The Vindel River area has experienced a decrease in the human population over several decades, but more fish and more attractive landscapes provide a reason for staying, due to employment in tourism companies offering fishing activities. A study at one of the sites restored by the project (Beukabäcken) revealed that the fish population increased from about 7 individuals (brown trout and salmon) per 100 m2 in 2010 (before restoration) to around 32 individuals per 100 m2 in 2015. Furthermore, new spawning grounds were well used by fish, with good embryo survival rates. Fishing is prohibited in Beukabäcken as it is an important nursing area. However, the fishing management organisation in nearby Gargån reported increased sales of fishing licenses from 76 000 SEK in 2010 to 151 000 SEK in 2015; with a much higher increase in fishing license sales predicted in the near future.

Due to the good cooperation between partners representing the main involved sectors (Umeå University, Vindel River Fishery Advisory Board, the Swedish University of Agricultural Sciences, and the Swedish Agency for Marine and Water Management), the project successfully integrated scientific research and practical restoration work. Demonstration measures are likely to be replicated elsewhere in Sweden and the EU (e.g. Finland), and the sites continue to be used for field demonstrations.

Further information on the project can be found in the project's layman report and After-LIFE Conservation Plan (see "Read more" section).

References

External links

Vindelälvsdalen

Rivers of Västerbotten County
Ramsar sites in Sweden